Prapashticë or Propaštica is a village in the District of Pristina, eastern Kosovo. The village is located on the border between Kosovo and Serbia. The neighborhood village in Serbia is Medevce in municipality of Medveđa.

Notable people
 Isa Mustafa — politician, former Mayor of Pristina, former Prime Minister of the Republic of Kosovo.
Ismet Asllani - Albanian Nationalist.

Notes

References

Villages in Pristina
Kosovo–Serbia border crossings